Events from the year 2020 in Saint Kitts and Nevis

Incumbents 

 Monarch: Elizabeth II
 Governor-General: Tapley Seaton
 Prime Minister: Timothy Harris
 Speaker: Anthony Michael Perkins

Events 
Ongoing: COVID-19 pandemic in Saint Kitts and Nevis

 1 January – 2020 New Year Honours
 24 March –  A 21-year-old male and a 57-year-old female who had arrived in the federation from New York City became the first two confirmed cases of COVID-19.
 31 March – A full lockdown goes into effect due to the rising COVID-19 cases.
 19 May – The country is declared COVID free after all cases had recovered.
 5 June – 2020 Saint Kitts and Nevis general election: The ruling coalition, Team Unity consisting of PAM, CCM and PLP, won a landslide victory with nine out of the eleven directly elected deputies, and netting a combined 54.85% of the vote.

Deaths 

 24 January – Kennedy Isles, 28, Saint Kitts and Nevis footballer

References 

 
Years of the 21st century in Saint Kitts and Nevis
Saint Kitts and Nevis
Saint Kitts and Nevis
2020s in Saint Kitts and Nevis